Votna is a lake in Ullensvang Municipality in Vestland county, Norway. The  lake lies about  straight east of the village of Røldal.  The European route E134 highway runs along the northern part of the lake.  There is a dam on the southwest end of the lake which regulates the level of the lake for purposes of hydroelectric power generation.

See also
List of lakes in Norway

References

Lakes of Vestland
Ullensvang
Reservoirs in Norway